Richard Frederick Bernstein (October 31, 1939 – October 18, 2002) was an American artist associated with pop art and the circle of Andy Warhol.  
For nearly 20 years he was the cover artist for Interview Magazine.

Early life and education
Bernstein was born on October 31, 1939, in New York City to a family with an older brother, David and younger sister, Ellen. His father, Herbert Bernstein, was a clothing manufacturer and his mother, Florence, was a homemaker. His mother first took him to the Museum of Modern Art children's school, where he saw works by Piet Mondrian, Pablo Picasso, and other artists. Bernstein received a bachelor's degree in fine arts from the Pratt Institute and M.F.A. from Columbia University, studying with Richard Lindner.

Career 
Bernstein's first exhibition was at the Iris Clert Gallery in Paris. His work was also presented at the Axiom Gallery in London, the Gallery Barozzi in Venice, the Gallery Monet in Amsterdam, and the Nancy Hoffman Gallery in New York City.  His works are in several museum collections, including the Corcoran Gallery of Art, Washington D.C., the Stejdlik Museum, Amsterdam, the Metropolitan Museum of Art, and the Museum of Modern Art.

In the early 1960s, he moved into the Hotel Chelsea, where he lived until his death in 2002. In the late 1960s, he met Andy Warhol who had become an admirer of Richard Bernstein's art work. In 1972, he was hired by Andy Warhol's Interview Magazine and became part of the Warhol millieu and the nightlife scene at venues such as Max's Kansas City and Studio 54. Bernstein was commissioned by the World Federation of United Nations to create a UN postage stamp in 1990.

In the introduction to Megastar, a 1984 compilation of Bernstein's Interview covers, Paloma Picasso observed, "Richard Bernstein portrays stars. He celebrates their faces, he gives them larger-than-fiction size. He puts wit into the beauties, fantasy into the rich, depth into the glamorous and adds instant patina to newcomers."

In 2018 The Estate of Richard Bernstein produced the book Richard Bernstein STARMAKER: Andy Warhol's Cover Artist, by Roger Padilha and Mauricio Padilha published by Rizzoli.

Collaborations

Coach x Richard Bernstein SS20 collection debuted in September 2019 at New York Fashion Week and was dubbed "The Most Instagrammed Moment"of fashion week. The collection was a tremendous success for Coach.

Death
On October 18, 2002, Bernstein died of complications of AIDS at his apartment at the Hotel Chelsea, where he had lived since the early 1960s, at the age of 62. He is buried in Mount Ararat Cemetery in Farmingdale, New York.

Museum collections
 MoMA, New York
 Metropolitan Museum of Art, New York
 Hirshhorn Museum. Washington, D.C.
 Stedelijk Museum, Amsterdam
 Foundation Vincent Van Gogh Arles, France
 National Portrait Gallery, Washington, D.C.
 Yale University Art Gallery

References

External links
 

1939 births
2002 deaths
20th-century American male artists
21st-century American male artists
AIDS-related deaths in New York (state)
American pop artists
Artists from New York City
Burials in New York (state)
Columbia University School of the Arts alumni
American gay artists
People associated with The Factory
American portrait painters
Pratt Institute alumni